Ferndale is a town and community located in the Rhondda Valley in the county borough of Rhondda Cynon Taf, Wales. Neighbouring villages are Blaenllechau, Maerdy and Tylorstown. Ferndale was industrialised in the mid-19th century. The first coal mine shaft was sunk in 1857 and was the first community to be intensively industrialised in the Rhondda Valley.

History 
In Welsh, Ferndale  is known as Glynrhedynog, the name of one of the old farms on which the town is built. In its infancy Glynrhedynog was also known as Trerhondda after the name of the first large chapel to be built in the town. The naming of settlements after chapels was widespread in Wales at the time, as is shown in village names such as Bethesda, Beulah and Horeb, but neither Glynrhedynog nor Trerhondda was destined to be used for long.
Glynrhedynog is made from the words "glyn" meaning valley and "rhedynog" meaning ferny, and so coal from the Glynrhedynog pits was marketed as Ferndale coal, a much easier name for English buyers to assimilate.

The Ferndale pits are what drew the workforce and their families to the area, and by the 1880s "Ferndale" was well established as a thriving town. With the phasing in of bilingual road signs from the late 1980s onwards, the name Glynrhedynog gradually reappeared and is now the officially designated Welsh language name for Ferndale. The Welsh language is on the increase in Ferndale after the village adopted the English language during the Industrial revolution. A Welsh language school is situated near the park and the school is named after the park's lake, 'Llyn-y-Forwyn' (The Maiden's Lake).

Industry 
The pioneer of coal mining at Ferndale was David Davis of Blaengwawr, Aberdare who already had an extensive colliery business in the neighbouring Aberdare Valley. His wealth enabled him to engage in costly but unsuccessful singings in the Rhondda Fach in the 1860s until he finally struck a good seam at Ferndale.

Ferndale Colliery disasters 
Two large coal mining colliery disasters occurred in Ferndale during the 19th century. The first occurred on 8 November 1867, when an underground explosion killed 178 miners at the Ferndale Colliery owned by David Davis and Sons Ltd. The second disaster happened on 10 June 1869 when a further explosion resulted in the death of 53 miners.

Governance 
A Ferndale electoral ward was coterminous with the borders of the Ferndale community and elected two county councillors to Rhondda Cynon Taf County Borough Council. Since 1995 representation was mainly by the Labour Party but the ward had a Plaid Cymru councillor from 1999 to 2004 and an Independent councillor from 2012 to 2017. At the May 2017 election Labour and Plaid Cymru won a councillor each.

A 2018 review of electoral arrangements by the Local Democracy and Boundary Commission for Wales would see Ferndale merged with neighbouring Maerdy. The proposals would take effect from the 2022 council elections. The 'Ferndale and Maerdy' ward would elect two county borough councillors.

Modern Ferndale 
Ferndale has developed over recent years. Some new features have been added such as a new astro-turf field, car park and an all weather cricket training enclosure. The Sky1 TV comedy series Stella is largely filmed on location in Ferndale.

Transport 
Passenger services were withdrawn in 1964 but coal trains continued until August 1986 when the line closed completely. Coal from Mardy Colliery was then raised through Tower Colliery. The track was lifted in 1996. Since 2005, the southern section from Porth to Pontygwaith is now the A4223 Porth and Lower Rhondda Fach Relief Road (Porth Bypass). The upper section including the section passing Ferndale has become a branch of the Taff Trail cycleway.

Religion 
There are several chapels and churches in or near Ferndale:
 St Dunstan's Church (Church in Wales)
 Bethel Baptist Church
 Rhondda Fach Methodist Church (also called Ferndale Methodist Church)
 Capel Penuel (Calvinistic Methodist)
 Trerhondda Welsh Independent Chapel

Sport 

Ferndale is home to rugby union club Ferndale RFC, whose first XV team play in the Welsh Rugby Union leagues.

Adjacent to Llyn y Forwyn is an astro-turf football field that, during the Summer, annually becomes the ground of sports days for many of the local junior schools.  Also within the confines of Darran Park can be found a tennis court and bowling green.

In December 2006, the Ferndale Skate Park was opened with indoor ramps and other equipment available to BMX riders, rollerbladers and skateboarders. The skatepark began with the aim of improving the prospects of school leavers in the area, providing a 'safe haven' from the influences of drugs and alcohol and an attempt to bring sports and healthy living to the area in a novel approach. It has since received National Lottery continuation funding as well as a Rhondda Trust grant to secure the future for an additional 3-year period. It closed in 2014.

Notable people 

Sir Stanley Baker (1928–1976), actor
Roderick Jones (1910–1992) 
Meirion James Trow (1949-), author
The Welsh nationalist writer D. J. Williams of Rhydcymerau, Carmarthenshire, worked as a teenager in local mines, and lodged at 32 Dyffryn Street, circa 1905.
Sir Wyn Lewis Williams, High Court judge, was born in Ferndale.

References

External links 
www.geograph.co.uk : photos of Ferndale and surrounding area
Welsh Coal Mines – local pit histories
Ferndale Skatepark

Rhondda Valley
Towns in Rhondda Cynon Taf
Communities in Rhondda Cynon Taf
Former wards of Rhondda Cynon Taf